The Tarbelli were an Aquitani tribe dwelling in the present-day regions of Labourd and Chalosse, in the west of Aquitania, during the Iron Age.

Alongside the Auscii, they were one of the most powerful peoples of Aquitania.

They were subjugated in 56 BC by the Roman forces of Caesar's legatus P. Licinius Crassus.

Name 
They are mentioned as Tarbelli by Caesar (mid-1st c. BC), as Tárbelloi (Τάρβελλοι) by Strabo (early 1st c. AD), as Tarbelli Quattuorsignani by Pliny (1st c. AD), and as Tarbellus on an inscription.

Joaquín Gorrochategui proposed to see the name as the suffix tar- attached to the adjective bel ('black'), which is common in Aquitanian onomastics.

Geography 
The Tarbelli lived in the regions of Labourd and Chalosse, on both sides of the Adour river. Their territory was located east of the Atlantic Ocean, north of the Vardulli, south of the Cocosates, west of the Tarusates, Atures and Venarni.

Their chief town was known as Aquae Terebellicae or Aquae Tarbellicae (present-day Dax).

Culture 
It is believed that the Tarbelli spoke a form or dialect of the Aquitanian language, a precursor of the Basque language.

Political organization 
The Tarbelli were a confederation of four tribes. The Cocosates and Tarusates were probably their clients.

Economy 
Gold extraction and mineral springs brought them a certain wealth, although their main activities remained centred on field and meadow husbandry.

See also 
 Aquitani
 Gallia Aquitania

References

Bibliography 

Aquitani
Basque history